We Are the Night may refer to:

 We Are the Night (album), 2007 album by The Chemical Brothers
 We Are the Night (film), 2010 German film
 We Are The Night (band), South Korean indie rock band